The First Ikeda Cabinet is the 58th Cabinet of Japan headed by Hayato Ikeda from July 19 to December 8, 1960.

Cabinet

References 

Cabinet of Japan
1960 establishments in Japan
Cabinets established in 1960
Cabinets disestablished in 1960